Seboomook Lake is an unorganized territory in Somerset County, Maine, United States. The population was 23 at the 2020 census.

Geography
According to the United States Census Bureau, the unorganized territory has a total area of 3,715.8 km2 (1,434.7 mi2). 3,628.4 km2 (1,400.9 mi2) of it is land and 87.4 km2 (33.8 mi2) of it (2.35%) is water.

Seboomook Lake

Seboomook Lake is a reservoir on the West Branch Penobscot River. The reservoir extends upstream from Seboomook Dam in Seboomook Township, through Plymouth Township, to the confluence of the North Branch and South Branch Penobscot River in Pittston Academy Grant.

Townships
The territory consists of 40 townships plus portions of three other townships (shared with Northeast Somerset).

 Tomhegan
 Brassua
 Thorndike
 Sandy Bay
 Bald Mountain (T4R3)
 Alder Brook
 Soldiertown
 West Middlesex Canal Grant
 Big W
 Little W
 Seboomook
 Plymouth
 Pittston Academy Grant
 Hammond
 Prentiss
 Blake Gore
 T4R5 NBKP
 Dole Brook
 Comstock
 T4R17 WELS
 Elm Stream
 Russell Pond
 T5R17 WELS
 T5R18 WELS
 T5R19 WELS
 T5R20 WELS
 Big Six
 T6R18 WELS
 T6R17 WELS
 Saint John
 T7R16 WELS
 T7R17 WELS
 T7R18 WELS
 T7R19 WELS
 T8R16 WELS
 T8R17 WELS
 T8R18 WELS
 T8R19 WELS
 T9R16 WELS
 T9R17 WELS
 T9R18 WELS
Big Ten
T10R16 WELS

Demographics

At the 2000 census there were 45 people in 22 households, including 11 families, in the unorganized territory. There were 368 housing units at an average density of 0.1/km2 (0.3/mi2).  The racial makeup of the unorganized territory was 100% White.
Of the 22 households 18.2% had children under the age of 18 living with them, 50% were married couples living together, 4.5% had a female householder with no husband present, and 45.5% were non-families. 40.9% of households were one person and 4.5% were one person aged 65 or older. The average household size was 2.05 and the average family size was 2.75.

The age distribution was 15.6% under the age of 18, 2.2% from 18 to 24, 20.0% from 25 to 44, 57.8% from 45 to 64, and 4.4% 65 or older. The median age was 50 years. For every 100 females, there were 150 males. For every 100 females age 18 and over, there were 137.5 males.

The median household income was $49,167 and the median family income was $61,250. Males had a median income of $46,250 versus $0 for females. The per capita income for the unorganized territory was $32,578. There were no families and 11.1% of the population living below the poverty line, including no under-eighteens and none of those over 64.

References

Unorganized territories in Maine
Populated places in Somerset County, Maine
North Maine Woods